Timothy Nolen (born July 9, 1941) is an American actor and baritone who has had an active career in operas, musicals, concerts, plays, and on television for over four decades. He notably portrayed the title role in the first operatic presentation of Stephen Sondheim's Sweeney Todd at the Houston Grand Opera in 1984. He later reprised the role at Chicago's Marriott Theatre in 1993, receiving a Joseph Jefferson Award nomination for his portrayal. He then performed the role of Judge Turpin in a concert version of Sweeney Todd broadcast on PBS's Great Performances in 2000 with the New York Philharmonic, George Hearn, Patti LuPone, and Neil Patrick Harris. He has since played Sweeney Todd in numerous productions, including those at the San Francisco Opera and most recently, the Lyric Opera of Chicago in 2017.

Early life 
Nolen was born in Rotan, Texas, and began his career appearing in small supporting roles with opera companies in the United States during the 1960s.

Career 
He made his debut at the San Francisco Opera as the Officer in the United States premiere of Darius Milhaud's Christophe Colomb on October 5, 1968. He appeared in several supporting roles with the company through 1973, including Gregorio in Roméo et Juliette, Marullo in Rigoletto, Montano in Otello, Morales in Carmen, Ned Keene in Peter Grimes, Schaunard in La Bohème, Sciarrone in Tosca, and the Wigmaker in Ariadne auf Naxos among others. He then portrayed leading roles at the SFO like Figaro in The Barber of Seville (1976, with Frederica von Stade as Rosina), Dr. Malatesta in Don Pasquale (1980, with Geraint Evans in the title role), and Dr. Falke in Die Fledermaus (1990, with Patricia Racette as Rosalinde).

He made his Broadway debut in 1985 as Doyle in the original production of Larry Grossman's Grind; a portrayal for which he received a Drama Desk Award for Outstanding Featured Actor in a Musical nomination. He later returned to Broadway to portray the title role in the musicals The Phantom of the Opera and the Comte de Guiche in Cyrano: The Musical (1994). His television appearances include guest star appearances in The Sopranos, Wildfire, and Guiding Light.

Nolen made his debut at the Metropolitan Opera on October 1, 1996 as Krusina in Bedřich Smetana's The Bartered Bride under the baton of James Levine. He has since returned to that house as Baron Zeta in The Merry Widow (2000–2001, with Plácido Domingo as Count Danilovich) and the One-Eyed Man in Die Frau ohne Schatten (2001–2002, with Deborah Voigt as the Empress).

References

External links
 Official Website of Timothy Nolen
 
 

1941 births
Living people
American male musical theatre actors
American operatic baritones
American male television actors
People from Rotan, Texas
Singers from Texas
Male actors from Texas
Classical musicians from Texas
20th-century American  male opera singers
20th-century American male actors
21st-century American male opera singers
21st-century American male actors